The Main Street Cemetery is a historic cemetery on Main Street in Dalton, Massachusetts.  Although the cemetery dates to 1781, much of it was laid out in the 19th century, during the rural cemetery movement.  Its most prominent burials are those of the Crane family, whose papermaking business, Crane and Company, has dominated Dalton since the 1820s.  The cemetery was listed on the National Register of Historic Places in 2000.

Description and history
The Main Street Cemetery is located on the western fringe of Dalton's developed downtown area, near its town line with Pittsfield. It is bounded on the south by Main Street, the west by Park Avenue, the north by properties fronting on John Street, and the east by properties fronting on Willis Street and Flansburg Avenue. Its most visible element is a long concrete wall, built in 1911, that separates it from Main Street. The cemetery grounds consist of meandering gravel paths, dotted with mature trees and other plantings. The cemetery has more than 850 burials, and remains in active use.

The oldest portion of the cemetery appears to be its northeastern section, which is where the town's first meeting house was located.  The cemetery's oldest dated burials are from 1788, not long after the town's incorporation (1784).  The two largest plots in the cemetery are those of the Crane and Weston families, both of which have been historically important to the town's papermaking business.  The cemetery chapel, built in 1907, is a prominent local example of Gothic Revival architecture, designed by the Pittsfield firm of Harding & Seaver.

Notable interments
Josephine Porter Boardman, socialite and patron of the arts who co-founded the Metropolitan Museum of Art
Bruce Crane, Businessman and politician who was president and chairman of Crane & Co. and a member of the Massachusetts Governor's Council
Winthrop Murray Crane, political figure and businessman who was Lieutenant Governor of Massachusetts, Governor of Massachusetts, and a United States senator
Byron Weston, Lieutenant Governor of Massachusetts from 1880 to 1883

See also
East Main Street Cemetery
National Register of Historic Places listings in Berkshire County, Massachusetts

References

Cemeteries on the National Register of Historic Places in Massachusetts
Cemeteries in Berkshire County, Massachusetts
National Register of Historic Places in Berkshire County, Massachusetts
Dalton, Massachusetts
Cemeteries established in the 1780s
1781 establishments in Massachusetts